King Rience , also spelt Ryence, Ryons, and Rion(s), is a character from Arthurian legend, an enemy of King Arthur in the early years of his reign. His realm varies; in Thomas Malory's Le Morte d'Arthur, he is king of North Wales, Ireland and "many isles".

He is most notable for his habit of trimming his robe with the beards of eleven kings he has conquered, he wants Arthur's for a complete twelve. This identifies him with the giant Ritho mentioned in Geoffrey of Monmouth's History of the Kings of Britain, who had the same modus operandi and who was also killed by Arthur.

Malory leaves Rience's fate unclear: he is kidnapped by Sir Balin and his brother Sir Balan, forced to submit to Arthur, and never mentioned again. Earlier tales, such as the Prose Merlin section of the Lancelot-Grail Cycle, have him killed in battle against Arthur.

Because of the similarity of their names some writers, such as Alfred, Lord Tennyson, identify him with King Urien.

Arthurian characters
Fictional kings